Suman Bery is an Indian economist, academic, and writer who is the newly appointed Vice Chairman of NITI Aayog. After serving at the World Bank for 28 years, Bery served as the Chief Economist of Oil and Gas supermajor Royal Dutch Shell, based in The Hague, Netherlands. He is a Global Fellow in the Woodrow Wilson International Center for Scholars in Washington DC and a Non-resident Fellow of Brussels based think tank Bruegel. He was the former director general of National Council of Applied Economic Research and the former Indian country director of International Growth Centre.

Education
Bery was educated at The Doon School in Dehradun, and then spent a year at Oakham School, UK. He then went to Magdalen College, University of Oxford, where he read philosophy, politics and economics, and later received a master's degree in public affairs from the Woodrow Wilson School of Public and International Affairs, Princeton University.

Career
Suman worked at the World Bank for 28 years, and later became the lead economist. His career at the Bank spanned research on financial sector development and country policy and strategy, notably in Latin America and the Caribbean. His country experience included Brazil, Argentina, Chile and Peru. Areas of focus included the macro-economy, financial markets, and public debt management.

From 1992-1994, on leave from the World Bank, Mr. Bery worked as Special Consultant to the Reserve Bank of India, Bombay, where he advised the Governor on financial sector policy, institutional reform, and market development and regulation. 

In 2001, he left the World Bank to become the director general of National Council of Applied Economic Research(NCAER). He was the director general and chief executive of NCAER from 2001 till 2011. He is also a senior visiting fellow at Centre for Policy Research. 

Bery was most recently Royal Dutch Shell’s Chief Economist between 2012-2016.

While at Shell he led a collaborative project with Indian think tanks to apply scenario modelling to India’s energy sector. 

In previous roles, Suman has served as a member of the Prime Minister’s Economic Advisory Council, of India’s Statistical Commission and of the Reserve Bank of India’s Technical Advisory Committee on Monetary Policy. 

He is a Global Fellow in the Asia program of the Woodrow Wilson International Center for Scholars in Washington DC, a Nonresident Fellow of the Brussels think-tank Bruegel, as well as a Senior Fellow of the Mastercard Center for Inclusive Growth.

He also serves on the board of the Shakti Sustainable Energy Foundation in New Delhi, a non-profit dedicated to supporting India’s transition to a low-carbon future. 

He regularly contributes columns to newspapers, journals, and magazines, including Forbes, Business Standard, Indian Express, and Economic and Political Weekly.

Bibliography
 Bery, Suman (co-author), India Policy Forum 2008 - 2009, SAGE Publishing, July 2009, 
 Bery, Suman (co-author), India Policy  Forum 2010 - 2011, SAGE Publishing, July 2011, 
 Bery, Suman (co-author), Energizing India: Towards a Resilient and Equitable Energy System, SAGE Publishing, December 2016,

References

External links
Bruegel profile
Author's profile on Indian Express

Alumni of the University of Oxford
Princeton School of Public and International Affairs alumni
World Bank people
Indian economists
Indian economics writers
21st-century Indian essayists
Indian columnists
Indian male writers
20th-century Indian writers
Indian Express Limited people
Living people
Indian foreign policy writers
Indian journalists
People educated at Oakham School
The Doon School alumni
Year of birth missing (living people)